

The Civil Aviation Department Revathi was a light utility aircraft designed in India principally for use by that country's flying clubs.

Description
The Revathi was a conventional, low-wing monoplane with fixed tailwheel undercarriage and two seats side-by-side with an optional third seat behind them. The fuselage construction was of welded steel tube, with the forward section skinned in aluminium and the tail section in fabric. The wings were of all-metal construction and originally fitted with wooden flaps and ailerons that were later replaced with metal surfaces. The tail surfaces were also originally wooden but later replaced with metal.

Development
The Revathi first flew on 13 January 1967 and received Indian type certification in January 1969.

The prototype's wings and fuel system were later revised, and the resulting configuration was designated the Revathi Mk.II.  It first flew in this configuration on 20 May 1970.  It received its Indian type certificate on 31 October 1972.

Specifications (Mk.II)

References

Further reading
 
 

1960s Indian civil utility aircraft
Low-wing aircraft
Single-engined tractor aircraft
Revathi
Aircraft first flown in 1967